"One More Pallbearer" is episode 82 of the American television anthology series The Twilight Zone, and was the 17th episode of the third season. The episode originally aired on January 12, 1962, was written by series creator/showrunner Rod Serling with a cast featuring Joseph Wiseman, Katherine Squire, Trevor Bardette and Gage Clarke.

Opening narration

Plot
Millionaire Paul Radin invites three people to the bomb shelter that he has built. He greets them politely but without genuine warmth as he holds a personal grudge against each of them. One is high school teacher Mrs. Langsford, who failed him when he was caught cheating on a test and attempting to frame another student; the second is Colonel Hawthorne, who had him court-martialed when Radin endangered lives by disobeying orders; and the third is Reverend Hughes, who made a public scandal out of a woman who committed suicide over him.

Radin, with the aid of sound effects and fake radio messages, convinces the trio that an apocalyptic nuclear war will occur in just moments. He offers them refuge in the shelter if they do one thing: apologize for their actions. All three refuse his offer, valuing their honor above their lives and preferring to spend a last few moments with their loved ones or alone than to live with Radin.

Radin, unable to believe that, opens the way out and pursues them to the elevator. Mrs. Langsford, still believing Radin will survive but be left alone, tells him to try to cope. She tells him that he has spent his life deluding himself about his own character and what is right and wrong: "It's a fantasy, and now you can have it all to yourself." As the elevator leaves, Radin shouts that this is not true.

The sound of a bomb detonation and footage of nuclear disaster fills the screen in Radin's shelter. He takes the elevator to the surface and emerges to see the world devastated and in ruin. However, it is revealed that Radin, devastated by his hoax's failure, has lost his mind and is only imagining the destruction. Radin sobs helplessly at the foot of a fountain outside his intact building while a police officer tries to aid him.

Closing narration

Cast
 Joseph Wiseman as Paul Radin
 Katherine Squire as Mrs. Langsford
 Trevor Bardette as Col. Hawthorne
 Gage Clarke as Rev. Hughes

References
 Zicree, Marc Scott. The Twilight Zone Companion, Bantam Books, 1982. 
DeVoe, Bill. (2008). Trivia from The Twilight Zone. Albany, GA: Bear Manor Media. 
Grams, Martin. (2008). The Twilight Zone: Unlocking the Door to a Television Classic. Churchville, MD: OTR Publishing.

External links

1962 American television episodes
The Twilight Zone (1959 TV series season 3) episodes
World War III speculative fiction
Television episodes written by Rod Serling